Silvia Chivás Baró (born September 10, 1954) is a former track and field athlete from Cuba.
 
At the age of 17 she won a bronze medal in the 100 metres at the 1971 Pan Am Games in Cali. During the same Games, she and her teammates would take the silver medal in the 4 x 100 metres relay.
At the 1972 Summer Olympics in Munich she won the bronze medal in 100 metres, and broke the world junior record in the first round with an 11.18 clocking. She won another bronze medal in 4 x 100 metre relay together with her teammates Marlene Elejarde, Carmen Valdés and Fulgencia Romay. In 1975 she would again win silver in the 4 x 100 metre relay at the Pan Am Games. She won a bronze in the 100 meters, and a gold in the 200 meters at the World Student Games in 1977, where she would lower her national record in the 100 metres to 11.16 in the semi-final. She would also set the national record for  200 metres in 1977, stopping the clock at 22.85. Silvia would take a bronze in the 100 meters at first World Cup of Track and Field. In 1978 she would win 3 gold medals at the Central American and Caribbean Games in both the sprints and the sprint relay. In 1979 she and her teammates would take a bronze medal at the Pan Am Games in 1979, she would retire after these games at only age 25.

References

Sports Reference

1954 births
Living people
Cuban female sprinters
Olympic athletes of Cuba
Olympic bronze medalists for Cuba
Athletes (track and field) at the 1972 Summer Olympics
Athletes (track and field) at the 1976 Summer Olympics
Athletes (track and field) at the 1971 Pan American Games
Athletes (track and field) at the 1975 Pan American Games
Athletes (track and field) at the 1979 Pan American Games
Place of birth missing (living people)
Medalists at the 1972 Summer Olympics
Pan American Games silver medalists for Cuba
Pan American Games bronze medalists for Cuba
Pan American Games medalists in athletics (track and field)
Olympic bronze medalists in athletics (track and field)
Universiade medalists in athletics (track and field)
Central American and Caribbean Games gold medalists for Cuba
Competitors at the 1978 Central American and Caribbean Games
Universiade gold medalists for Cuba
Central American and Caribbean Games medalists in athletics
Medalists at the 1977 Summer Universiade
Medalists at the 1971 Pan American Games
Medalists at the 1975 Pan American Games
Medalists at the 1979 Pan American Games
Olympic female sprinters